AFL Ontario is the largest Australian football league in North America. It is currently composed of teams from the Greater Toronto Area, Southwestern Ontario and the National Capital Region, who play off for the Conacher Cup (named after Lionel Conacher), presently awarded to the winner of the annual AFL Ontario Grand Final.

AFL Ontario, along with the North West Pacific Football League is a member of AFL Canada, the governing body for the sport in Canada.

History
AFL Ontario which was originally known as the Canadian Australian Football League (CAFA) and more recently as the Ontario Australian Football League (OAFL), was established in 1989. Two teams were formed that year - the Toronto Panthers and the Mississauga Mustangs, with a draft of interested players prior to a three-game season and Grand Final. The coaches of those inaugural teams – John Pearson (Toronto Panthers) and Terence Wallis (Mississauga Mustangs) brought a significant amount of experience from playing at a high level in Australia. An interesting fact is that the first Grand Final was attended by a number of AFL executives including Ron Barrassi and members of the Geelong Cats and Melbourne Demons.

Founding members of the original competition include: Kingsley Ellis (ex-Fitzroy VFL - lead central Umpire, founder of the Hamilton Tigers), Terence Wallis (founded & coached the Mississauga then Toronto Dingos), Bill Frampton (Mississauga then founded the Brampton Bulldogs), Sandro Mancino (Toronto Eagles, Scarborough Rebels and then founded the Balmy Beach Saints). These pioneers set the foundation for the current competition. During the early years CAFA played a number of International games against visiting teams from Australia (Balmain FC, Golden Oldies touring team) as well as the team representing the Australian Rules league in England. The Canadian team narrowly missed beating the touring Australian teams over the years, but soundly defeated England on the four occasions that it played them (1990–1996) culminating in a strong win by the touring Canadian team in London (1996) coached by Terence Wallis.

In 2011, with the increased interest in women's football, AFL Ontario established their Women's League with great success. With the help of the Ontario Trillium Foundation, 2011 also saw the development of AFL Ontario's junior competition. 2012 saw the women's division double in size to 6 teams competing, and the junior competition continued over the summer holidays.

Division 2
In 2009, AFL Ontario launched a second division originally consisting of six founding teams. London (Ontario) AFC withdrew before the official start to the season and the team's players were absorbed into the Quebec Saints. Along with the Saints, the Toronto Central Blues, Broadview Hawks, Etobicoke 'Old Boys' Roos and Toronto Eagles made up the founding five teams of the new OAFL Division 2 competition. In honour of the first Canadian to ever play in the AFL the competition's premiership cup was named the Mike Pyke Cup (named after Mike Pyke).

The OAFL Division 2 season was traditionally shorter than that of the OAFL. In 2009 due to teams playing different numbers of matches the ladder was determined by 'Match Ratio' rather than premiership points. In 2010 all teams competed in 8 rounds and thus the ladder reverted to determining positions by premiership points.

2010 also saw the introduction of hybrid teams. New team the Toronto Rebel Dogs (a partnership between the Toronto Downtown Dingos and the Toronto Rebels) and the 'DevilRoos' (a partnership between the Etobicoke Roos and High Park Demons). The Toronto Eagles withdrew their team from the 2010 season.

Clubs

Current clubs

Affiliated (non-league) clubs

Past Men's clubs

Past champions

Principal venues
Margaret Green Park, Guelph: Grand River Gargoyles
Mohawk Sports Park, Hamilton: Hamilton Wildcats
Manotick Polo Club, Ottawa: Ottawa Swans
Humber College South, Toronto: Etobicoke Kangaroos, Toronto Dingos, High Park Demons, Toronto Rebels, Toronto Eagles and Central Blues

Participation
In 2006, AFL Ontario had around 330 senior players consisting of over 170 Canadian nationals. With the rapid increase in awareness and interest in Australian football in Ontario, this has increased in 2012 with almost 650 senior men and women members.

See also

AFL Canada
Australian Football Association of North America
Australian rules football in Canada
Countries playing Australian rules football
United States Australian Football League

Notes

References

External links
 

 
Sport in Ontario
Australian rules football leagues in Canada
Sports leagues established in 1989
1989 establishments in Ontario